Celluloid is a 2013 Indian Malayalam-language biographical film co-produced, written and directed by Kamal, starring Prithviraj, Sreenivasan, Mamta Mohandas and Chandni in the lead roles.  The film is a biopic based on the life story of J.C. Daniel, the father of Malayalam cinema, the making of his film Vigathakumaran and the story of Vigathakumarans heroine P. K. Rosie. The film is particularly based on Life of J. C. Daniel, a biography of J. C. Daniel written by Chelangatt Gopalakrishnan. Filming started in November 2012. The film's online posters were done by a 16-year-old boy Aswin which was viral in social medias. and it was released in February 2013. The film opened with positive reviews and received seven Kerala State Film Awards including for Best Film and Best Actor (Prithviraj). The movie received many awards and much appreciation with the support of All Lights Film Services (ALFS), a leading film festival consultancy. The film was a blockbuster at the box office.

Synopsis
Celluloid tells the tale of J. C. Daniel and his love for cinema. He goes to great lengths to get the equipment required to make a movie, writing numerous letters, visiting places and meeting Dadasaheb Phalke, the man who brought cinema to India. Getting an actress to act in his movie was a tough task. It is decided that Rosamma, named later as P K Rosy, will essay the lead role in J. C. Daniel's revolutionary 'motion picture' venture, Vigathakumaran, the story of which J. C. Daniel himself conceived. He sells everything to make his dream a reality, further borrowing money to meet the expenses. When Vigathakumaran is finally screened at Capitol Theatre, a 'cinemapura', the upper caste members of the audience create a ruckus over a lower-caste girl acting as a Nair lady. Rosie, hunted by the Madambis leaves town never to be seen again. Years later, the shrivelled, impoverished Daniel, with only his wife Janet by his side, is leading a life far removed from what he had envisaged. Chelangatt Gopalakrishnan's interest in Daniel's life, his efforts to give him his due and the flashbacks to the incidents in Daniel's life after Vigathakumaran form the rest of the movie.

Cast

Production
Prithviraj was selected to play the lead role in this film. It was then reported that Samvrutha Sunil will be playing the role of Janet, the wife of J.C. Daniel, which was supposed to be her last film before her marriage. But later Mamta Mohandas replaced her. Chandni, a singer who shot to fame through the reality show Josco Indian Voice, was selected to play the role of P. K. Rosie, Malayalam cinema's first heroine. The character of Dada Phalke was given to actor Nandu Madhav who had done the same role for the 2009 Marathi film Harishchandrachi Factory (which itself dealt with the struggles in making the first Indian feature film Raja Harishchandra by Dada Phalke) Sreenivasan enacts the role of Chelangatt Gopalakrishnan who worked and lobbied tirelessly to give Daniel his due in Kerala. The online posters for the film were done by a sixteen-year-old boy Aswin Ks which was selected for promotion and wiki updates.'Celluloid' is the first film to have the youngest publicity designer.

The film was shot at Thiruvananthapuram and Mysore. The film was dubbed to Tamil as J. C. Daniel and released in August 2013.

Soundtrack
M. Jayachandran's soundtrack has been well appreciated by the critics and audiences alike. "Enundodee", a song which is a throwback to the yesteryears, rendered by Sithara became a hit on TV and internet. The song "Katte Katte" sung by Vaikom Vijayalakshmi and G. Sreeram has also been termed a hit. Engandiyoor Chandrasekharan and Rafeeq Ahammed penned lyrics for the songs.

Festival screenings
The film was an official selection for the following film festivals:
 Indian Film Festival Japan – International Competition section.
 Indian Film Festival of Houston – International Competition section.
 Bollywood Film Festival Norway – International Competition section.
 ImagineIndia International Film Festival Madrid
 New Generation Film Festival
 Pune International Film Festival India
 Jaipur International Film Festival India
 International Sport Film Festival Italy
 Queens World Film Festival, USA
 ReelWorld Film Festival, Toronto, Canada
 International Film Festival for Comedy Romance and Musical Film Festival, Indonesia 2013
 6th Nashik International Film Festival 2014
 Columbia George International Film Festival, USA 2014

Accolades
The film has received the following accolades:International Film AwardsInternational Film Festival for Comedy Romance and Musical Film Festival, Indonesia – Award of ExcellenceNational Film Awards2012 National Film Award for Best Feature Film in MalayalamKerala State Film Awards'''
2012 Kerala State Film Award for Best Film
2012 Kerala State Film Award for Best Actor – Prithviraj
2012 Kerala State Film Award for Best Music Director – M. Jayachandran
2012 Kerala State Film Award for Best Singer – Sithara Krishnakumar (Song : Enundodee Ambilichantham)
2012 Kerala State Film Award for Best Costume Designer – S. B. Satheesh
2012 Kerala State Film Award for Best Art Director – Suresh Kollam
2012 Kerala State Film Awards Special Jury Mention – G. Sreeram, Vaikom Vijayalakshmi – 'Katte Katte Nee' Song

Critical reception
Aswin Kumar of The Times of India gave 3.5 stars out of 5 and said "Celluloid, a moving tribute to Malayalam cinema from director Kamal is touching, poetic and immensely powerful. On a sprawling canvas, Kamal diligently recreates an age and fills it with characters who go on to become iconic figures in the history of Malayalam cinema. Prithviraj can hold this role close to his heart, so can Mamta. The dialect of Prithviraj may seem a bit jarring at times. But he masks it with an over-powering rendition of a character that transforms from youth to an ageing, frail, defeated soul."

Paresh C Palicha of Rediff.com said "In Celluloid'' Kamal shows what 'passion for cinema' really meant before it became a stylish thing to say. Prithviraj is good and consistent as Daniel. Chandni gives a lifelike performance as Rosy with stars in her eyes."

Controversies
The film allegedly contains derogatory remarks on renowned writer and civil servant Malayatoor Ramakrishnan and former Kerala Chief Minister K. Karunakaran which sparked off a controversy in Kerala. Karunakaran is not openly mentioned but Malayattoor is being portrayed as a casteist who never wanted a Nadar to be given the title as the father of Malayalam cinema. This was followed by a controversial interview by Kamal in which he stated that Karunakaran and Malayatoor Ramakrishnan had roles in denying justice to J. C. Daniel by not recognising him as the father of Malayalam cinema. Kamal had pointed out in the interview that actor Siddique's character in the film essayed Malayatoor Ramakrishnan and he deliberately avoided mentioning the names of Karunakaran and Malayatoor to avoid controversies.

The row over the film continued to be in the headlines for over a week with various writers, politicians and cultural icons commenting on the issue. "My father was the one who did all he could for the benefit of Malayalam movies, and even thought of a film studio in the state capital and instituting pensions for the film fraternity. A thousand Kamals cannot tarnish his image", K. Muraleedharan, Karunakaran's son, said on the portrayal of his father as a villain. But he after seeing the movie told that there was nothing about Karunakaran in the film and this ended the controversy.

See also
 Harishchandrachi Factory

References

External links
 

2013 films
2010s Malayalam-language films
Films scored by M. Jayachandran
Indian biographical films
History of Kerala on film
Films directed by Kamal (director)
Indian films based on actual events
Films shot in Thiruvananthapuram
Films shot in Mysore
2010s biographical films